Troi may refer to:

 Deanna Troi, fictional character in the Star Trek universe
 Lwaxana Troi, fictional character in the television series Star Trek: The Next Generation and Star Trek: Deep Space Nine
 Ménage à Troi (TNG episode), episode from the third season of Star Trek: The Next Generation
 Radu Troi (born 1949), Romanian footballer
 Troi Zee, American actress and singer